"My Kind of Christmas" is a 1961 song by Johnny Mathis written by Jerry Livingston with lyrics by Paul Francis Webster. It was released as a standalone Christmas single in November 1961, with the Allyn Ferguson/Syd Shaw composition "Christmas Eve" on the B-side. When Mathis' 1958 Merry Christmas album was re-reissued on CD in 1998 the A- and B-sides of the 1961 single were included as bonus tracks.

References

1961 songs
1961 singles
American Christmas songs
Johnny Mathis songs
Songs written by Jerry Livingston
Songs with lyrics by Paul Francis Webster
Columbia Records singles
Fontana Records singles